is a trainset series operated by Nagoya Railroad, including the . Like the Romancecar trains of Odakyu Electric Railway, they are designed to be tourist oriented limited express trains, although they also operate on  services.

The very first Panorama Car was the 7000 series in 1961, and featured Japan's first 180 degree "Panoramic" seating view. Then came the 8800 series Panorama DX in 1984, followed by the 1000 series Panorama Super and its sister, the 1600 series, launched in 1999.

See also 
 Observation car
 Vistadome

References

External links
 Meitetsu website 

Named passenger trains of Japan
Nagoya Railroad
Railway services introduced in 1961